Thomas Hussey (fl. 1395), of North Bowood, Dorset, was an English politician.

He was a Member (MP) of the Parliament of England for Dorchester in 1395. His son, Thomas, was also an MP.

References

Year of birth missing
Year of death missing
Thomas
English MPs 1395
Members of the Parliament of England for Dorchester